Cosmic Circuits was an Indian company that developed, licensed and marketed differentiated analog and mixed signal Semiconductor IP cores for use on System-on-Chips. The company got acquired by Cadence Designs Systems in May 2013. Cosmic Circuits was a winner of the 2007 Red-Herring Asia top-100 award.

Management Team 

 Ganapathy Subramaniam, Chief Executive Officer.
 C. Srinivasan, Vice President of Engineering.
 Prakash Easwaran, Vice President and CTO.
 A. Nagaraj, Vice President of Finance and Admin

Products 
 A/D Converters
 Clocking and Specialty PLL
 D/A Converters
 Temperature Sensors for System on Chip
 Power Management for SoC
 MIPI and sub-LVDS
 Audio Codecs and Class-D amplifier
 Analog ASIC
 PM ASIC

Products 

 WiMO platform:
Data converters for Wireless communications applications such as Wireless LAN and WiMAX MIMO systems.
 

 Custom A/D Converters:
Low-power A/D converters for monitoring applications, suitable for portables such as MP3 players, PMPs, touch sensing, RF power-level monitoring, voltage monitoring and many others.
 Power-On SoC:
Power-ON SoC through on-chip power regulators.
 Temperature-Sensor:
With digital readout in 65 nm process.

References

External links
Official website

Semiconductor companies of India
Fabless semiconductor companies
Electronics companies established in 2005
Manufacturing companies established in 2005